Dixie High School  is located at 350 East 700 South, in St. George, Utah, United States.  It is a Utah Class 4A school (2017-2019 classification) and reported 1,248 students on October 1, 2018.  The school's mascot is the Flyers and is represented by a World War I-era biplane pilot. It is a part of the Washington County School District.

History

Dixie High School was the first high school in St. George, and was founded in 1911 under the name St. George Academy.  Nicknamed "Dixie" Academy, the tradition of white-washing the name "DIXIE" on a sandstone rock formation overlooking the St. George valley (the Sugarloaf) began in 1913. The name comes from a regional nickname, that began with Mormon pioneers in the area. In 1963 the Dixie Academy split into Dixie High School and Dixie College (which eventually became Utah Tech University).

Dixie High transitioned to a new building in the early 2000s.  Construction began in 2001 with a new arts department wing that featured an auditorium and choir and band rooms.  The main, three-story school building was constructed in an adjacent parking lot.  In 2004 the student body moved to the new building, and the majority of the old building was torn down (one classroom remains for use as auto-tech classes).  Construction was completed before the 2005–2006 school year with a new gym and water feature.

The 2010–2011 school year marked the 100th year of the school.

Notable alumni

Dia Frampton, musician
Meg Frampton, musician
Kelly Graves, women's basketball head coach at Gonzaga University
Bruce C. Hafen, first Quorum of Seventy, The Church of Jesus Christ of Latter-day Saints
Jeffrey R. Holland, Apostle, The Church of Jesus Christ of Latter-day Saints
Bruce Hurst, Major League Baseball pitcher
Doug Jolley, National Football League tight end
Raven Quinn, musician
Elwood Romney, All-American basketball player at BYU
Maurine Whipple, author

References

External links

Dixie High School website

Utah Tech University
Educational institutions established in 1911
Public high schools in Utah
Buildings and structures in St. George, Utah
Schools in Washington County, Utah
1911 establishments in Utah